Jeremiah Krage is a British-American actor who appears in television, including the 2015 reboot of Teletubbies as Tinky Winky.

Career
Among his many credits he appeared in the eighth series Doctor Who as a Cyberman, portrayed Zak in ZingZillas, and in 2015, Krage was chosen to portray Tinky Winky the purple Teletubby in the new series of Teletubbies. He is the third actor, after Dave Thompson and Simon Shelton, to play the character. He will later reprise the role as Tinky Winky in the upcoming Netflix reboot series.

Filmography

TV series
Doctor Who – Cyberman
Nuzzle and Scratch: Frock and Roll - Prince
Pixelface – Twin Robot, The Bug
Teletubbies – Tinky Winky (2015–2018)
ZingZillas – Zak

References

External links
Jeremiah Krage IMDB page

Living people
British male actors
British people of American descent
Year of birth missing (living people)